Joshua Luke Gordon (born 10 October 1994) is an English professional footballer who plays as a striker for League Two side Barrow.

Career
Gordon played youth football for his hometown club Stoke City but was released as a sixteen-year-old. He eventually joined the junior ranks at Newcastle Town before making his way through the age groups to the first team playing in the Evo-Stik Division One South. He combined his early non-league football career with playing basketball, before giving up the latter to focus on football.

A spell at Nantwich Town followed before he moved to Welsh club Rhyl in February 2016. He made just one league appearance for Rhyl before returning to Nantwich.

After a successful spell with Stafford Rangers, where he scored 11 times in the 2016–17 season, he earned a move to reigning Premier League Champions Leicester City in April 2017.

Having failed to break into the first team at Leicester, Gordon signed for Walsall in August 2018. He scored his first professional goal in an EFL Cup tie with Macclesfield Town on 28 August 2018.

He was offered a new contract by Walsall in November 2020, which he rejected.

On 16 June 2021 it was announced that Gordon would transfer to Barrow at the end of the month, after failing to agree a new contract with Walsall.

Personal life
Gordon studied for a university degree alongside his non-league career, earning a BA (Hons) in Sports Development and Coaching from Staffordshire University.

Career statistics

Honours
Individual
Walsall Player of the Year: 2019–20

References

1994 births
Living people
English footballers
Stoke City F.C. players
Newcastle Town F.C. players
Nantwich Town F.C. players
Rhyl F.C. players
Stafford Rangers F.C. players
Leicester City F.C. players
Walsall F.C. players
Barrow A.F.C. players
English Football League players
Association football forwards
Alumni of Staffordshire University